Arnold le Boteler, the first recorded 'lord' of the Welsh village of Pembrey, was a late 11th and early 12th century Norman squire with a penchant for property development.

He established the manor house and estate which is now known as Court Farm, Pembrey during the reign of William the Conqueror. Earlier, he had acquired Dundryfan manor from his lord, Maurice de Londres, for services rendered, and had built the first stone building, Dunraven Castle, on the site.
Arnold's service to Maurice de Londres was the defence of Ogmore Castle while the lord defended against Welsh insurgence, led by Princess Gwenllian ferch Gruffydd, at Kidwelly Castle.

The le Boteler/Butler family crest can be seen in plasterwork in St. Illtud's Church, Pembrey. The le Boteler estate passed to the Earl of Ashburnham.

External links 
 Walks and history around Dunraven House.
 Sadly inaccurate schoolteacher's video supporting restoration of le Boteler's Court House in Pembrey.
 Reference to the "faithful servant."

11th-century births
12th-century deaths
Anglo-Normans in Wales
People from Carmarthenshire